Takhnali is a village in the Shamkir Rayon of Azerbaijan.

References
 

Populated places in Shamkir District